Mohalla Azama Nagar is a Pakistani village near the village of Thikrian and the city of Lalamusa.

Populated places in Gujrat District